Ennu Ninte Moideen (English: Yours Truly, Moideen) is a 2015 Indian Malayalam-language biographical romantic drama film written and directed by R. S. Vimal, based on the real-life story of Kanchanamala and B. P. Moideen, which took place in the 1960s in Mukkam, Kozhikode. Prithviraj Sukumaran and Parvathy Thiruvothu essay the title characters of Moideen and Kanchanamala while Bala, Tovino Thomas, Sai Kumar, Sashi Kumar and Lena appear in supporting roles.

Music was composed by M. Jayachandran and Ramesh Narayan, while background score was composed by Gopi Sunder. The cinematography was by Jomon T. John. Upon release, it received a positive critical response and was a commercial success, becoming one of the highest-grossing Malayalam films of all time, grossing more than 50 crore at the box office. It is widely regarded as one of the best movies of the Malayalam New Wave movement.

Plot
Set in the 1960s and 70's in Mukkam, Kerala, the film tells the tragic love story of Moideen who belongs to a renowned Muslim family and Kanchanamala who is the daughter of an aristocratic Hindu Thiyya landlord. Since inter-religious marriages were considered a taboo then, the couple had to part ways as their families objected to their love affair.

Moideen shifted ground to being a socio-political activist and Kanchanamala lived in her house under strict restrictions for 22 years. Both communicated through letters and a language they had developed. Eventually Kanchanmala was caught and beaten mercilessly by her conservative relatives. Balyambra Pottattu Unni Moideen Sahib, Moideen's father, stabs him since Moideen does not agree to part ways with Kanchanamala but he miraculously escapes. Moideen reveals to the judge and police that it was an accident and his father was not responsible. This confession transforms Balyambra Pottattu Unni Moideen Sahib's attitude towards his son; however, he dies immediately afterwards due to a heart attack. Eventually, Moideen and Kanchana decide to elope but when Moideen was returning after collecting their passports, the boat he was traveling on gets caught in a whirlpool. Although he managed to save his fellow boat-mates, he gets caught in the whirlpool and dies. His body is found 3 days later. Upon hearing about his death, Kanchana decides to commit suicide but is stopped by Moideen's mother. In the end, Kanchana leaves home to live in Moideen's house, as Moideen's unmarried widow.

Cast

 Prithviraj Sukumaran as Balyambra Pottattu Moideen
 Parvathy Thiruvothu as Kottatil Kanchanamala
 Bala as Kottatil Sethu Madhavan
 Tovino Thomas as Perumparambil Appu
Sai Kumar as Balyambra Pottattu Unni Moideen Sahib
 Sashi Kumar as Kottatil Madhavan
 Lena as Pathumma
 Sudheer Karamana as Mukkam Bhasi
 Sivaji Guruvayoor as Kunjammavan
 Sudheesh as Kottathil Ramachandran
 Kalaranjini as Janaki
 Surabhi Lakshmi as Maaniyamma, servant in Kanchana's house
 Indrans as Nottan Vaidyar
 Disney James as Prabhavathi's Husband
 Kozhikode Narayanan Nair as Appu's father
 Majeed as Ullatil Sahib
 George Tharakan K. J. as Sub-inspector
 Balaji Sarma as Mukkam Narayanan
 Vijayan Karanthoor as Soofi haji
 Krishna Namboothiri
 Jayashankar Karimuttam
 Aneesh Gopal
 Nandan Unni
 Master Roshan as Kochappi
 Sija Rose as Ameena
 Devi Ajith as Moideen's aunt
 Roslin as Appu's mother
 Sneha Raj as Ramadevi
 Charutha Baiju as Leela
 Jaya Noushad as Singer in drama
 Swathi Noushad as Indrani, Kanchana's sister
 Shilpa Raj as Marina 
 Vaigha Rose
 Deepika Mohan
 Kozhikode Saradha
 Kozhikode Ramadevi
 Preetha Pradeep
 Jija Surendran
 Nila Noushad
 Badri Krishna as Velayudhan

Production
The film is based on the real life love story of Moideen and Kanchanamala, which happened in the 1960s in the backdrops of river Iruvanjippuzha and Mukkam village. Vimal first made the story into a documentary film and then developed it into a full-length feature film. In October 2014, Kanchanamala had accused Vimal of "tweaking their story", stating that several incidents had not been shown correctly in the film.

Prithviraj was chosen to play Moideen upon the insistence of real-life Kanchanamala, as she felt that he had a resemblance to Moideen. Tovino Thomas was signed to play Appuettan (Kanjanamala's cousin), who said that Prithviraj suggested him for the role.

The film was launched at Mascot Hotel in Thiruvananthapuram on 9 July 2014. The shoot was supposed to begin in the first week of August 2014 but was postponed due to rain. Though set entirely in Mukkam, the film was not shot there; it was shot mostly in Shoranur and nearby areas.

Soundtrack

The background music for the film was composed by Gopi Sunder, who also composed a song. Other songs were composed by M. Jayachandran and Ramesh Narayan. Rafeeq Ahamed penned the lyrics. A poem by renowned poet Changampuzha Krishna Pillai was used in the film.

The song "Mukkathe Penne" was composed within five minutes. Gopi Sunder says, "We were doing the background music when director requested us to create a background song for the movie. Mohammed Maqbool Mansoor, a singer who helps me with the Sufi notes, was there during that time. I hummed this tune to him for which he wrote lyrics. He crooned it and thus the song was born." For the song "Kathirunnu", M. Jayachandran won the National Film Award for Best Music Direction for the first time in his career.

Release

The film released on 19 September 2015 in Kerala and outside Kerala on 2 October. The television satellite right of Ennu Ninte Moideen was purchased for an amount of  7 crore by Asianet, which is the highest satellite purchasing amount in Malayalam.

Film festival screening
The film was among the seven films selected to be screened in the Malayalam Cinema Today section of the 20th edition of the International Film Festival of Kerala (IFFK). However, director R. S. Vimal decided to withdraw the film from the festival as it was not included in the Competition Section.

Critical response

The Hindu wrote that the film "presents a classic case of how a compelling real life incident can be adapted for the screen without compromising on the aesthetics of the medium." Writing for the same newspaper, Baradwaj Rangan stated, "Even with flatly written characters and plodding narration, the film strikes a chord. We respond to the film because few among us have experienced a love so mythic — it's the emotive equivalent of cheering for Erik Weihenmayer, the blind man who conquered Everest."

Veeyen of Nowrunning.com rated 3/5 and opined that it is "a slow-burner that invites its viewers to soak themselves in a compelling romantic tale that is prudently drawn from real life." He added: "A pithy, well-acted and remarkably crafted film, this devastating narrative of love, comes across as a true celebration of the tender, expectant spirit that lies deep within it." He further commented on the film maker by stating that "..some brilliant movies are based on such true stories, and Vimal can rest assured that he has done fine justice in adapting the much admired real-life chronicle on to the big screen." Hailing the film as "probably the best love story to have graced the screens in the last decade in Malayalam Cinema," Rejath RG of Kerala Kaumudi described it as " a masterful piece of cinema that is sure to leave a long lasting impression in the hearts of moviegoers." He commented on the filmmaker saying,  "R S Vimal has made a gem of a movie, an unforgettable love story of epic proportions."

G. Ragesh of Malayala Manorama rated the film 3.5/5 and described it as "a love saga at its ethereal best". He wrote: "Apart from being an inquiry into the unknown realms of human emotions such as love, revenge and envy the film has a smooth narrative which offers a glimpse into the socio-political milieu of the time." He appreciated Vimal's direction, saying that "the clarity with which the director worked on it [the film] is remarkable."

Describing the film as "one of the best ever love stories made in Malayalam cinema and the best movie of recent times," Akhila Menon of Filmibeat.com gave a rating of 4/5. She wrote: "It is wonderful to watch the classic form of romance back on the screen, in its complete glory." She added that a "well-written script plays the backbone for the film" and "the only minus factor [of the film] is, Kanchanamala gets over-shadowed by Moideen certain points." Kanchanamala became an icon of woman sacrifice for eternal love as per the readings of R. Suresh Kumar in online news paper Azhimukham. Sethumadhavan of Bangalore Mirror rated the film 4/5 and said, "Despite the story being so old, the screenplay is powerful enough to hook the audience and make one ignore a few loose ends. Whenever and wherever cinematic liberty has been taken, it does not come across as jarring." Shyamlee Ahmed of The American Bazaar noted that the "powerful story is a far cry from the modern day puppy love stories coming out of Bollywood" and that the film "will be here to stay in our hearts "ennum" (forever), for its effervescent one of a kind eternal love."

Box office
The film collected approximately 81 lakh on the first day of release and 1.25 crore in the second day, with Malabar region contributing a major share. It collected 6.32 crore in 6 days and 10.5 crore when it completed 9 days from Kerala alone. The film collected 19 crores from 18 days from Kerala alone. On 14 October 2015, Filmibeat.com reported that the film's gross collection crossed 21.8 crore, making it the biggest hit in Prithviraj's career. Within a month of release, the film's collection from Kerala theatres alone was 27.2 crore. It grossed about  32.67 crore and a net  25.56 crore from Kerala in 42 days; the film's all India gross crossed  37.50 crore for the same.

The film grossed $107,666 (₹ 71.79 lakh) within eight weeks of its theatrical run in the US and after the 12th weekend at the UK box office, Ennu Ninte Moideen is said to have collected a gross amount of Â£23,698 (₹ 23.40 lakh).

The film collected an estimated  50 crore from Worldwide box office to become one of the highest grossing Malayalam films of all time, and the film ran over 150 days in theatres.

Awards and nominations
As of 28 March 2016, Ennu Ninte Moideen received 55 wins and 63 nominations.

References

External links

Further reading
 
 
 

2015 films
2010s Malayalam-language films
2015 romantic drama films
2015 biographical drama films
Indian romantic drama films
Indian films based on actual events
Romantic drama films based on actual events
Films set in the 1960s
Films set in the 1970s
Indian biographical drama films
Indian interfaith romance films
Films shot in Kozhikode
2015 directorial debut films